Malik JonMikal Beasley (born November 26, 1996) is an American professional basketball player for the Los Angeles Lakers of the National Basketball Association (NBA). He attended Saint Francis School in Alpharetta, Georgia, and played one season of college basketball for the Florida State Seminoles. Beasley was drafted by the Denver Nuggets with the 19th overall pick in the 2016 NBA draft. After three and a half seasons with the Nuggets he was traded to the Minnesota Timberwolves. In mid-2021, Beasley served 78 days of a 120-day sentence in jail related to a firearm-brandishing incident.

High school career

Beasley attended Saint Francis School in Alpharetta, Georgia. As a senior, he averaged 22.2 points, 6.9 rebounds, 2.9 assists, 1.9 steals, and 0.6 blocks, earning the Class 1A Player of the Year of the state of Georgia and an All-State Class A First Team. He attended high school with Kobi Simmons, Kaiser Gates, and Jacob Davis (Birmingham–Southern College football player).

Regarded as a four-star prospect by Rivals.com, Beasley committed to Florida State over offers from UConn, UCLA, Wake Forest, Oregon, and others.

College career
As a freshman at Florida State in 2015–16, Beasley averaged 15.6 points, 5.3 rebounds, and 1.5 assists in 29.8 minutes per game over 34 games. He was subsequently named to the Atlantic Coast Conference's all-freshman team, and ranked eighth in the conference in free throw percentage (.813) and 10th in field-goal percentage (.471).

On March 21, 2016, Beasley declared for the NBA draft, forgoing his final three years of college eligibility.

Professional career

Denver Nuggets (2016–2020)
Following the conclusion of the 2015–16 season, Beasley had surgery to repair a stress fracture in his right leg. Because of this, he did not participate in pre-draft workouts. Despite having medical concerns entering the 2016 NBA draft, Beasley was selected with the 19th overall pick by the Denver Nuggets. On August 9, 2016, he signed his rookie scale contract with the Nuggets. Beasley appeared in just two of the Nuggets' first seven games of the season, and managed under eight minutes of action and failed to score in those two games. He had a breakthrough game on November 10, 2016, scoring 12 points in 15 minutes off the bench in a 125–101 loss to the Golden State Warriors. During his rookie season, Beasley has had multiple assignments with the Sioux Falls Skyforce of the NBA Development League, pursuant to the flexible assignment rule.

On February 1, 2019, Beasley had a career-high 35 points in a win over the Houston Rockets.

Minnesota Timberwolves (2020–2022)
On February 5, 2020, Beasley was traded to the Minnesota Timberwolves in a four-team, 12-player trade. After the trade to Minnesota, Beasley received the starting job and his scoring output drastically increased. In 14 games with the Timberwolves, he averaged 20.7 points, 5.1 rebounds, and 1.9 assists per game while starting all 14 games.

On November 27, 2020, Beasley re-signed with the Timberwolves on a reported four-year, $60 million contract. On February 25, 2021, Beasley was suspended for 12 games as a result of a guilty plea in a criminal case. At the time of the suspension, he was averaging a career-high 20.5 points per game and shooting 40% from 3-point range. The Timberwolves were a league-worst 7–26.

On March 5, 2022, Beasley broke the Timberwolves franchise record for most three-pointers made in a single season, surpassing Kevin Love's 190. Four days later, he made a franchise record 11 three-pointers, along with 33 points, in a 132–102 win over the Oklahoma City Thunder. On April 16, 2022, during Game 1 of the first round of the playoffs, Beasley scored 23 points in a 130–117 win over the Memphis Grizzlies.

Utah Jazz (2022–2023) 
On July 6, 2022, Beasley was traded, alongside Patrick Beverley, Jarred Vanderbilt, Leandro Bolmaro, the draft rights to Walker Kessler, four future first round picks and a pick swap, to the Utah Jazz in exchange for Rudy Gobert. On October 19, Beasley made his Jazz debut, logging 15 points and five rebounds in a 123–102 win over the Denver Nuggets.

Los Angeles Lakers (2023–present)
On February 9, 2023, Beasley was traded to the Los Angeles Lakers in a three-team trade involving the Minnesota Timberwolves. He made his Lakers debut two days later, recording four points and two rebounds in a 109–103 win over the Golden State Warriors.

Personal life
Beasley is the son of Michael Beasley. His father played professional basketball in Chile, the Dominican Republic, and Puerto Rico. His grandfather John Beasley is a film and television actor who played the role of Notre Dame football Coach Warren, welcoming new walk-on players to fall practice, in the movie classic Rudy. On March 26, 2019, Malik and his wife Montana Yao had their first child. They welcomed a second child, a daughter, on November 11, 2022.

Criminal case 
On September 27, 2020, Beasley was arrested for marijuana possession, concealing stolen property, and for an incident in which he brandished a firearm. He was initially released from law enforcement custody but later faced charges in Hennepin County stemming from the incident. Beasley pled guilty to the felony charge of making a threat of violence in December 2020 and was sentenced to serve 120 days in jail, with confinement occurring after the conclusion of the 2020–21 NBA season. Beasley served 78 days of the 120-day sentence and was released in August 2021.

Career statistics

NBA

Regular season

|-
| style="text-align:left;"|
| style="text-align:left;"|Denver
| 22 || 1 || 7.5 || .452 || .321 || .800 || .8 || .5 || .3 || .0 || 3.8
|-
| style="text-align:left;"|
| style="text-align:left;"|Denver
| 62 || 0 || 9.4 || .410 || .341 || .667 || 1.1 || .5 || .2 || .1 || 3.2 
|-
| style="text-align:left;"|
| style="text-align:left;"|Denver
| 81 || 18 || 23.2 || .474 || .402 || .848 || 2.5 || 1.2 || .7 || .1 || 11.3
|-
| style="text-align:left;" rowspan=2|
| style="text-align:left;"|Denver
| 41 || 0 || 18.2 || .389 || .360 || .868 || 1.9 || 1.2 || .8 || .1 || 7.9
|-
| style="text-align:left;"|Minnesota
| 14 || 14 || 33.1 || .472 || .426 || .750 || 5.1 || 1.9 || .6 || .1 || 20.7
|-
| style="text-align:left;"|
| style="text-align:left;"|Minnesota
| 37 || 36 || 32.8 || .440 || .399 || .850 || 4.4 || 2.4 || .8 || .2 || 19.6
|-
| style="text-align:left;"|
| style="text-align:left;"|Minnesota
| 79 || 18 || 25.0 || .391 || .377 || .817 || 2.9 || 1.5 || .5 || .2 || 12.1
|-
| style="text-align:left;"|
| style="text-align:left;"|Utah
| 55 || 13 || 26.8 || .396 || .359 || .841 || 3.6 || 1.7 || .8 || .1 || 13.4
|- class="sortbottom"
| style="text-align:center;" colspan="2"|Career
| 391 || 100 || 21.7 || .424 || .380 || .819 || 2.6 || 1.3 || .6 || .1 || 10.8

Playoffs

|-
| style="text-align:left;"|2019
| style="text-align:left;"|Denver
| 14 || 0 || 20.1 || .387 || .404 || .710 || 3.4 || 1.0 || .2 || .1 || 8.1
|-
| style="text-align:left;"|2022
| style="text-align:left;"|Minnesota
| 6 || 0 || 19.8 || .432 || .320 || .833 || 3.3 || .7 || .3 || .2 || 8.5
|- class="sortbottom"
| style="text-align:center;" colspan="2"|Career
| 20 || 0 || 20.0 || .401 || .375 || .730 || 3.4 || .9 || .3 || .1 || 8.2

College

|-
| style="text-align:left;"|2015–16
| style="text-align:left;"|Florida State
| 34 || 33 || 29.8 || .471 || .387 || .813 || 5.3 || 1.5 || .9 || .2 || 15.6

References

External links

 Florida State Seminoles bio

1996 births
Living people
American men's basketball players
Basketball players from Atlanta
Denver Nuggets draft picks
Denver Nuggets players
Florida State Seminoles men's basketball players
Los Angeles Lakers players
Minnesota Timberwolves players
People from Alpharetta, Georgia
Shooting guards
Sioux Falls Skyforce players
Sportspeople from Fulton County, Georgia
Utah Jazz players